

Princes of Kakheti

The Chosroids
–637 – Adarnase I, also prince of Iberia since 627.
637–650 – Stephen I, also prince of Iberia
650–684 – Adarnase II, prince of Iberia
685–736 – Stephen II
736–741 – Mirian
736–786 – Archil “the Martyr”
786–790 – Ioanne 
786–807 – Juansher

Chorbishops  

786–827 – Grigol  
827–839 – Vache Kvabulidze
839–861 – Samuel, Donauri
861–881 – Gabriel, Donauri 

 881–893 – Padla I Arevmaneli

893–918 – Kvirike I
918–929 – Padla II
929–976 – Kvirike II
976–1010 – David 
1010–1014 – Annexation by the Kingdom of Georgia
1014–1029 – Kvirike III
1029–1039 – Annexation by the Kingdom of Georgia

Kings of Hereti

Grigol Hamam (893–897)
Adarnase (897–943)
Ishkhanik (943–951)
John (951–959)

Kings of Kakheti and Hereti
1039–1058 – Gagik 
1058–1084 – Aghsartan I
1084–1102 – Kvirike IV
1102–1105 – Aghsartan II

Kings of Kakheti
1465–1476 – George I
1476–1511 – Alexander I
1511–1513 – George II "the Bad"
1513–1520 – Annexation by the Kingdom of Kartli
1520–1574 – Levan
1574–1602 – Alexander II (Under the Ottoman suzerainty after 1578)
1602 – David I
1602–1605 – Alexander II (restored)
1605 – Constantine I
1605–1614 – Teimuraz I
1614–1615 – Direct Persian rule
1615–1615 – Teimuraz I (restored)
1616–1625 – Direct Persian rule
1625–1633 – Teimuraz I (restored)
1633–1633 – Direct Persian rule
1634–1648 – Teimuraz I (restored)
1648–1656 – Direct Persian rule (unified with Kartli) 
1656–1664 – Direct Persian rule (detached from Kartli)  
1664–1675 – Archil (Shāh Nazar Khān)
1675–1676 – Heraclius I (Nazar Alī Khān)
1676–1703 – Direct Persian rule
1703–1722 – David II (Imām Qulī Khān)
1722–1732 – Constantine II (Mahmūd Qulī Khān) (As vassal of Ottoman Empire) 
1732–1744 – Teimuraz II (As vassal of Ottoman Empire until 1735, later one of Persia)
1744–1762 – Heraclius II

Kakheti and Hereti
Kakheti and Hereti